The 2010 Eisenhower Trophy took place 28–31 October at the Buenos Aires Golf Club and the Olivos Golf Club in Buenos Aires, Argentina. It was the 27th World Amateur Team Championship for the Eisenhower Trophy and the second to be held in Argentina. The tournament was a 72-hole stroke play team event with 69 three-man teams. The best two scores for each round counted towards the team total. Each team was due to play two rounds on the two courses.

Weather delays on the second day meant that the second round was not completed until the third day and the event was reduced to 54 holes. The leading 36 teams played their third round at Buenos Aires Golf Club while the others played at Olivos Golf Club.

France won their first Eisenhower Trophy, four strokes ahead of Denmark, who took the silver medal. The United States took the bronze medal while New Zealand finished fourth. Joachim B. Hansen from Denmark had the best 54-hole aggregate of 209, 6 under par.

Teams
69 three-man teams contested the event.

The following table lists the players on the leading teams.

Results

Source:

The leading 36 teams played their third round at Buenos Aires Golf Club with the remaining teams playing at Olivos Golf Club.

Individual leaders
There was no official recognition for the lowest individual scores.

Source:

Players in the leading teams played two rounds at Buenos Aires Golf Club and one at Olivos Golf Club.

References

External links
Record Book on International Golf Federation website

Eisenhower Trophy
Golf tournaments in Argentina
Eisenhower Trophy
Eisenhower Trophy
Eisenhower Trophy